Akmal Khan, or Akmal, (11 November 1929, in Lahore, Pakistan – 11 June 1967) was a Pakistani film actor.

Early life and career
Akmal Khan's birth name was Mohammad Asif Khan and he was born in 1929 at Lahore, British India. Akmal Khan (his professional name) first became a film make-up artist and then he was introduced as an actor by the Pakistani film producer-director Anwar Kamal Pasha in his film Qatil (1955). In 1956, he appeared as a lead actor in the Punjabi language film Jabroo (1956). This was a hit film and Akmal got his breakthrough into the Pakistani film industry from this film.

Death 
Akmal died to a heat stroke on 11 June 1967. He is buried in Muslim Town Graveyard, Lahore.

Selected filmography

References

External links
  Filmography of Akmal Khan on IMDb website

1929 births
1967 deaths
Male actors from Lahore
Pakistani male film actors
Pakistani playback singers
Punjabi-language singers
Singers from Lahore
20th-century Pakistani male singers